|}

The Prix Imprudence is a Group 3 flat horse race in France open to three-year-old thoroughbred fillies. It is run over a distance of 1,400 metres (about 7 furlongs) at Maisons-Laffitte in April.

History
The event is named after Imprudence, a successful French-trained filly whose victories included three Classics in 1947. It was established in 1949, and was originally contested over a mile. It was cut to its present length in 1961.

For a period the Prix Imprudence held Listed status. It was promoted to Group 3 level in 2009.  It is currently staged on the same day as the Prix Djebel, the equivalent race for colts.

The Prix Imprudence can serve as a trial for various fillies' Classics in Europe. The last winner to achieve victory in the 1,000 Guineas was Natagora in 2008 and the last to win the Poule d'Essai des Pouliches was Ervedya in 2015.

Records
Leading jockey since 1979 (10 wins):
 Freddy Head – Ma Biche (1983), L'Orangerie (1984), Vilikaia (1985), Or Vision (1986), Miesque (1987), Lightning Fire (1989), Kenbu (1992), Macoumba (1995), Mahalia (1996), Pas de Reponse (1997)

Leading trainer since 1979 (10 wins):
 Criquette Head-Maarek – Ma Biche (1983), L'Orangerie (1984), Vilikaia (1985), Ravinella (1988), Macoumba (1995), Mahalia (1996), Pas de Reponse (1997), Cortona (1998), Stunning (2001), Magic America (2007)

Leading owner since 1979 (5 wins):
 Stavros Niarchos – Firyal (1980), Or Vision (1986), Miesque (1987), Lightning Fire (1989), Coup de Genie (1994)

Winners since 1979

Earlier winners

 1953: Cabriole
 1954: Bethora
 1955: Reinata
 1956: Cigalon
 1957: Fidgety
 1958: Bella Paola
 1959: Paraguana
 1960: Never Too Late
 1961: Solitude
 1962: Monade
 1963: Hula Dancer
 1964: Texanita
 1966: Miliza
 1965: Clear River
 1967: Fix the Date
 1968: Salade Chinoise
 1969: Mismaloya
 1970: Balsane
 1971: Pomme Rose
 1972: Arosa
 1973: Libelinha
 1974: Lianga
 1975: Girl Friend
 1976: Guichet
 1977: Flota Armada
 1978: Best Girl

See also
 List of French flat horse races

References

 France Galop / Racing Post:
 france-galop.com – A Brief History: Prix Imprudence.
 galopp-sieger.de – Prix Imprudence.
 horseracingintfed.com – International Federation of Horseracing Authorities – Prix Imprudence (2019).
 pedigreequery.com – Prix Imprudence – Maisons-Laffitte.

Flat horse races for three-year-old fillies
Maisons-Laffitte Racecourse
Horse races in France
1949 establishments in France
Recurring sporting events established in 1949